The 2020 Women's Junior European Volleyball Championship was the 27th edition of the competition, with the main phase (contested between 9 teams) held in Bosnia and Herzegovina and Croatia from 22 to 30 August 2020.

Qualification 

The qualifying stage for the final tournament was cancelled due to the COVID-19 pandemic by the CEV on 15 June 2020. The tournament itself will be held with participants determined from European Ranking after the respective National Federations confirm their participation in the event. On 16 July, it was announced that all of them confirmed the wish to use their respective slot.

Venues

Pools composition
The drawing of lots was combined with a seeding of National Federations and performed as follows:
The two organisers were seeded in Preliminary pools. Bosnia and Herzegovina in Pool I and Croatia in Pool II.
Remaining 10 participating teams drawn after they were previously placed in five cups as per their position in the latest European Ranking

Result
The drawing of lots was held on 23 July 2020 in Luxembourg.

Before the start of the tournament it was announced that Italy, Russia and Germany have withdrawn due to travel restrictions imposed by COVID-19 pandemic.

Preliminary round

Pool I

|}

|}

Pool II

|}

|}

5th–8th classification

5th–8th semifinals

|}

7th place match

|}

5th place match

|}

Final round

Semifinals

|}

3rd place match

|}

Final

|}

Final standing

Awards

Most Valuable Player
  İpar Özay Kurt
Best Setter
  Lila Şengün
Best Outside Spikers
  Guewe Diouf
  Kseniya Liabiodkina

Best Middle Blockers
  Darya Sauchuk
  Hena Kurtagić 
Best Opposite Spiker
  Vanja Savić
Best Libero
  Gülce Güçtekin

See also
2020 Men's U20 Volleyball European Championship

References

External links

Women's Junior European Volleyball Championship
Europe
2020 in Bosnia and Herzegovina sport
Volley
Volley
International volleyball competitions hosted by Bosnia and Herzegovina
International volleyball competitions hosted by Croatia